Ganesh Gogoi dv(1907– 1938) was a poet of Assam and then he is remembered also as a lyricist, composer, playwright, actor and football player. He is also known as Papori Kobi.

Life
Ganesh Gogoi was born at Jorhat of Assam on 28 December 1907. His father's name was Kanak Chandra Gogoi.

Ganesh Gogoi's spent his childhood and student life in his native place Jorhat. Passed the Matric examination from Jorhat Government High School in the second division, After matriculation, he was admitted to Cotton College, Guwahati, Assam in the year 1926. He left for Kolkata in 1927 and was admitted to Ripon College (now called Surendranath College) for higher studies. Later on he also got admission to the Kashi Hindu university (Now Banaras Hindu University), but did not complete his study

Some of his famous dramas had pictured in 'Jorhat Theatre' where Ganesh Gogoi used to stage these dramas.
Drama
 Jerengar Sati (1937)
 Sakunir Pratisodh
 Kashmir Kurmari
 Lachit
 Kuri Satika, etc.

 Poetry
 Papori (1934) A romantic Assamese poetry book.
 Swapna bhanga (1934)
 Rupajyoti (1945)
 Naoria
 Boragi

Many songs were published in magazines like Banhi, Awahan, Ghar-Jeuti, Dainik Batori, Na-Jon, etc. at that time. His only book on lyrics is titled Geetimala.

Honours
 The Government of Assam to institute an award in the name of Ganesh Gogoi from the year 2009. This film was officially selected for South Asian Film Festival 2007 at Dhaka.
 A documentary entitled Ganesh Gogoir Jiban Surabhi has been produced on his life and works.
 A park named as Ganesh Gogoi Kabita Kanan  after him in Jorhat, Assam.

References

External links 

 Xoundarya aru Kobi, one poem of Ganesh Gogoi at Sofura
 Books
 History of Assamese literature, by Birinchi Kumar Barua
 Assamese literature: Volume 9, Part 2  – Page 84, Satyendranath Sarma
 Encyclopaedia of Indian Literature: devraj to jyoti, Amaresh Datta
 Audio
 Regha Dibo Lage Jodi (1979) Audio song

People from Jorhat district
Poets from Assam
Assamese actors
1907 births
1938 deaths
Surendranath College alumni
University of Calcutta alumni
20th-century Indian poets